Pseudolachnostoma is a genus of flowering plants belonging to the family Apocynaceae.

Its native range is Central and Southern Tropical America.

Species:

Pseudolachnostoma bernardii 
Pseudolachnostoma brasiliense 
Pseudolachnostoma cynanchiflorum 
Pseudolachnostoma parviflorum 
Pseudolachnostoma reflexum 
Pseudolachnostoma schunkei 
Pseudolachnostoma sucrense 
Pseudolachnostoma woytkowskii

References

Apocynaceae
Apocynaceae genera